Bandook is a 2013 Bollywood crime film starring Aditya Om, Manisha Kelkar and Arshad Khan. The film was directed and produced by Aditya Om and Mohammed M. K. Sheikh.

Synopsis
The film depicts the rise of Bhola Kevat, a lower caste boatman "Mallaah" ( Kewat) in the interiors of Uttar Pradesh rising to the unexpected heights of political power. Bandook connects crime and politics, a psychological peep inside the minds of people who use the power of the gun as a ladder to worldly success, It shows the vast distance covered by the human mind from picking a gun to pulling the trigger.

Development
Producer, director Aditya Om revealed he has been working on the script from two years as film is based on political Dons.

Cast
Aditya Om - Bhola Kevat
Manisha Kelkar - Kajri
Arshad Khan- Lochan Singh Yadav
Ashish Kotwal- Hari Om Tripathi
Gauri Shankar- Police Inspector Puttu Tiwari
Virendra Singh- Virendra Singh

Soundtrack
The music of the film was composed by Nikhil Kamath, Lavan and Veeral.

Release
Justin Rao from The Hitavada gave it one star, and said, "It tries to be everything in the end and loses its own track on which it established itself. The movie has 100 shots of bullets but sadly not a single shot of brilliance".
According to Box Office India, Bandook fails completely at boxoffice and termed as disaster.

References

External links

2013 films
Indian crime films
Films set in Uttar Pradesh
2010s Hindi-language films
2013 directorial debut films
2013 crime films
Hindi-language crime films